The England Boxing National Amateur Championships Middleweight Championship formerly known as the ABA Championships is the primary English amateur boxing championship. It had previously been contested by all the nations of the United Kingdom.

History
The middleweight division was inaugurated in 1881 and is currently contested in the under-75 Kg weight division. The championships are highly regarded in the boxing world and seen as the most prestigious national amateur championships.

Past Winners

References

England Boxing
 
Lists of English sportspeople
Lists of British boxing champions